Zoran Milutinović (Serbian Cyrillic: Зоран Милутиновић; born 1 March 1988) is a Bosnian footballer, who plays as a midfielder for SG Waidhofen/Ybbs.

He previously played with NK Inter Zaprešić.

Honours
Borac Banja Luka
First League of RS: 2018–19

References

External links
Zoran Milutinović at Slavia official website

1988 births
Living people
Bosnia and Herzegovina footballers
Bosnia and Herzegovina expatriate footballers
People from Prijedor
Association football midfielders
Bosnia and Herzegovina under-21 international footballers
1. FK Příbram players
FK Laktaši players
SK Slavia Prague players
FC Hlučín players
FK Rudar Prijedor players
NK Inter Zaprešić players
Tyrnavos 2005 F.C. players
FK Krupa players
FK Voždovac players
FK Borac Banja Luka players
Czech First League players
Czech National Football League players
Serbian SuperLiga players
First League of the Republika Srpska players
Premier League of Bosnia and Herzegovina players
Bosnia and Herzegovina expatriate sportspeople in the Czech Republic
Bosnia and Herzegovina expatriate sportspeople in Croatia
Bosnia and Herzegovina expatriate sportspeople in Greece
Bosnia and Herzegovina expatriate sportspeople in Serbia
Bosnia and Herzegovina expatriate sportspeople in Austria
Expatriate footballers in the Czech Republic
Expatriate footballers in Croatia
Expatriate footballers in Greece
Expatriate footballers in Serbia
Expatriate footballers in Austria